Rudolf (or Rudolph) van Eecke (23 October 1886, Buitenzorg, Java – 24 December 1975, Leiden) was a Dutch entomologist.
 
He attended the gymnasium in Leiden. In 1912 he married Wilhelmina Henriëtte Petré then in 1927 Margaretha Emma Julia Hettyey. In 1916 (Leidsch Jaarboekje 1917) he became a conservator at the Rijksmuseum van Natuurlijke Historie now merged with Rijksmuseum van Geologie en Mineralogie as Naturalis, where he worked on Lepidoptera.

Works
 selection of articles by R. van Eecke including De Heterocera van Sumatra I - VII and articles on Indo-Australian Lepidoptera, published by Leiden Museum 

1886 births
1975 deaths
Dutch entomologists
People from Bogor
20th-century Dutch zoologists